This is a list of world records created in Nepal or by Nepali citizen.

References

World records
Nepal